Six60 is the third self-titled full-length studio album by New Zealand rock band Six60. It was released on 8 November 2019 through New Zealand label Massive Entertainment. Production was handled mainly by Malay, together with Printz Board, Big Taste, E. Kidd Bogart and Justin Gray. It debuted atop of the Official New Zealand Music Chart on the week of 18 November 2019 and as of December 2020 has never left the top five since then. The album was certified triple platinum by Recorded Music NZ on 14 September 2020 and was New Zealand's best-selling album of 2020. The album featured six singles.

Track listing

Charts

Weekly charts

Year-end charts

Certifications

See also 
 List of number-one albums from the 2020s (New Zealand)
 List of number-one albums from the 2010s (New Zealand)

References

External links

2019 albums
Six60 albums
Albums produced by Malay (record producer)